UFC Fight Night: Holm vs. Vieira (also known as UFC Fight Night 206, UFC on ESPN+ 64 or UFC Vegas 55) was a mixed martial arts event produced by the Ultimate Fighting Championship that took place on May 21, 2022, at the UFC Apex facility in Enterprise, Nevada, part of the Las Vegas Metropolitan Area, United States.

Background
A bantamweight bout between former UFC Women's Bantamweight Champion Holly Holm and Ketlen Vieira headlined the event.

A heavyweight bout between Ben Rothwell and former UFC Light Heavyweight Championship challenger Alexander Gustafsson was expected to take place at this event. However, the fight was canceled after Rothwell was released from the organization in late March. Gustafsson would go on to face Nikita Krylov in a light heavyweight bout at UFC Fight Night: Blaydes vs. Aspinall.

Maxim Grishin was expected to face Jailton Almeida in a light heavyweight bout at the event. However, Grishin pulled out due to undisclosed reasons in late April. Almeida decided to move up to heavyweight and faced Parker Porter instead.

Results

Bonus awards
The following fighters received $50,000 bonuses.
 Fight of the Night: Michel Pereira vs. Santiago Ponzinibbio
 Performance of the Night: Chidi Njokuani and Chase Hooper

See also 

 List of UFC events
 List of current UFC fighters
 2022 in UFC

References 

UFC Fight Night
2022 in mixed martial arts
May 2022 sports events in the United States
2022 in sports in Nevada
Mixed martial arts in Las Vegas
Sports competitions in Las Vegas